Sipyloidea is a genus of stick insects of the family Lonchodidae. Species have been recorded from India, China, Indochina, through to Australasia. The genus was described by Brunner von Wattenwyl in 1893.

Species
The Phasmida Species File lists:
 Sipyloidea abnormis Redtenbacher, 1908
 Sipyloidea acanthonotus Günther, 1938
 Sipyloidea acutipennis (Bates, 1865)
 Sipyloidea adelpha Günther, 1940
 Sipyloidea albogeniculata Redtenbacher, 1908
 Sipyloidea atricoxis (Westwood, 1859)
 Sipyloidea bella (Tepper, 1905)
 Sipyloidea biplagiata Redtenbacher, 1908
 Sipyloidea bistriolata Redtenbacher, 1908
 Sipyloidea brevialata Redtenbacher, 1908
 Sipyloidea brevicerca Chen & He, 2008
 Sipyloidea brevicerci Hasenpusch & Brock, 2007
 Sipyloidea caeca (Sjöstedt, 1918)
 Sipyloidea cavata Chen & He, 1993
 Sipyloidea ceramia (Westwood, 1859)
 Sipyloidea ceylonica (Saussure, 1868)
 Sipyloidea completa Chen & He, 1993
 Sipyloidea doleschali Redtenbacher, 1908
 Sipyloidea eurynome (Stål, 1877)
 Sipyloidea excellens Günther, 1929
 Sipyloidea foenosa Redtenbacher, 1908
 Sipyloidea fontanesina Giglio-Tos, 1910
 Sipyloidea garradungensis Hasenpusch & Brock, 2007
 Sipyloidea gracilipes (Sjöstedt, 1918)
 Sipyloidea gularis (de Haan, 1842)
 Sipyloidea inscia Redtenbacher, 1908
 Sipyloidea larryi Hasenpusch & Brock, 2007
 Sipyloidea lewisensis Hasenpusch & Brock, 2007
 Sipyloidea nelida John, Rentz & Contreras, 1987
 Sipyloidea nitida Günther, 1938
 Sipyloidea okunii Shiraki, 1935
 Sipyloidea panaetius (Westwood, 1859)
 Sipyloidea rentzi Brock & Hasenpusch, 2007
 Sipyloidea reticulata Günther, 1930
 Sipyloidea robusta Günther, 1936
 Sipyloidea samsoo (Westwood, 1859)
 Sipyloidea shukmunae Seow-Choen, 2018
 Sipyloidea similis Rentz & John, 1987
 Sipyloidea sipylus (Westwood, 1859) - type species (as Necroscia sipylus Westwood)
 Sipyloidea stigmata Redtenbacher, 1908
 Sipyloidea supervacanea Redtenbacher, 1908
 Sipyloidea tuberculata Ho, 2017
 Sipyloidea warasaca (Westwood, 1859)
 Sipyloidea whitei Brock & Hasenpusch, 2007
 Sipyloidea wuzhishanensis (Chen & He, 2002)

References

External links
 
 

Lonchodidae
Phasmatodea genera
Phasmatodea of Asia